Vindication is the second studio album by Norwegian black metal band Susperia. It was produced by Peter Tägtgren completely free of charge before closing down his studio.

Track listing

Personnel 
Athera – vocals
Cyrus – lead and rhythm guitar
Elvorn – rhythm guitar
Memnock – bass
Tjodalv – drums

Production
Music recorded in Abyss Studio A – Sweden during November and December 2001
Music engineered and recorded by Lars Szöke
Vocals recorded in BBM Studio – Norway during December 2001
Vocals engineered and recorded by Bjorn Boge
Vocals produced by Athera. Assisted by Bjorn Boge
Album mixed by Peter Tägtgren
Album produced by Susperia and Peter Tägtgren
Album mastered at Cutting Room, Stockholm by Björn Engelmann
Cover design, artwork and logo by Rune Tyvold

References 

2002 albums
Susperia albums
Albums produced by Peter Tägtgren